Wojciech Fibak and Tom Okker were the defending champions, but lost in the final this year.

Peter Fleming and John McEnroe won the title, defeating Fibak and Okker 6–4, 6–4 in the final.

Seeds

Draw

Finals

Top half

Bottom half

External links
 Draw

Stockholm Open
1979 Grand Prix (tennis)